Pilica is a town in Zawiercie County, Silesian Voivodeship, Poland, with 1,936 inhabitants (2019).

History
Since the beginning of its existence, Pilica was part of the historic Lesser Poland region. In accordance with the testament of Duke Bolesław III Wrymouth (1138), it became part of the Seniorate Province with Kraków as it capital. The town rights were granted in around 1393. Several years after the January Uprising, Pilica lost its town privileges under the Tsar's ukase from June 1, 1869, and were restored in 1994.

Jewish community
Jews are first mentioned in Pilica in 1581, when they are accused of insulting the host. The historian Meier Balaban notes in his book The History of the Jews of Kraków and Kazimierz 1304–1868 (in Polish): “In the 16th Century the Jewish Kehilla of Krakow was subdivided into seven regional districts: Olkusz, Chrzanow, Wisnicz, Sacz, Bobowa, Pilica, Bedzin, Oshpitzin, and Wolbrom.”

Rabbi Pinchas Eliyahu Rotenberg, the nephew of Rabbi Yitzchak Meir Alter of Gur, was rabbi of the town until his death in 1903.

In 1905 Pilica became a famous centre of Hasidism. After a famous tzaddik from Góra Kalwaria died – Rabbi Yehudah Aryeh Leib Alter – a considerable number of Hasidim started to go on pilgrimages to the rabbi's brother-in-law, Rabbi Pinchas Menachem Justman author of Siftei Tzadik. The latter, on the other hand, was Pilica's rabbi.

By 1921, the majority of the town's residents were Jewish, with a Jewish population of 1,877 compared to a population of 3,299 overall. The town was occupied by the German army in September 1939. 2,000 Jews were kept imprisoned in a ghetto. In 1942, all the Jews were firstly transferred to the Wolbrom ghetto and then to the concentration camps. Today, no Jews live in Pilica.

References

External links

Pilica Official website
Jewish Community in Pilica on Virtual Shtetl

Cities and towns in Silesian Voivodeship
Zawiercie County
Kraków Voivodeship (14th century – 1795)
Kielce Governorate
Kielce Voivodeship (1919–1939)
Holocaust locations in Poland